Lombron Airfield is a former World War II airfield, located 1.0 km south-southwest of La Chapelle-Saint-Rémy in the Pays de la Loire region, France.

History
Lombron Airfield was built between 18 August and 3 September 1944 by the 834th Engineer Aviation Battalion, IX Engineering Command.  

The airfield was established as an  Emergency Landing/Refueling Airfield, however, it was not heavily used but  one unit temporarily settled at the base: the P-47 Thunderbolts of the 405th Fighter Group.  Although the airfield was not finished yet, advance parties of the Group was sent there with the remainder sent to Cretteville Airfield (A-14) on 25 August. The P-47s remained at the airfield until 13 September 1944, when the much better equipped former Luftwaffe airfield, Saint-Dizier–Robinson (A-64) became available.

The airfield was abandoned by the end of the month and returned to agricultural use. Nothing remains of the former airfield.

References
  Lombron (A-37)
 Johnson, David C. (1988), U.S. Army Air Forces Continental Airfields (ETO), D-Day to V-E Day; Research Division, USAF Historical Research Center, Maxwell AFB, Alabama.

External links 

World War II airfields in France
Airfields of the United States Army Air Forces in France
Airports established in 1944